Grattan Bridge is a road bridge spanning the River Liffey in Dublin, Ireland, and joining Capel Street to Parliament Street and the south quays.

History
The first bridge on this site was built by Sir Humphrey Jervis in 1676. It was named as Essex Bridge to honour Arthur Capell, 1st Earl of Essex, Lord Lieutenant of Ireland. It joined several of Jervis' developments (including Capel Street and Jervis Street) to the opposite side of the river and to Dublin Castle. Essex Bridge was an arched stone structure with 7 piers, and apparently partly constructed from the ruined masonry of nearby St. Mary’s Abbey on the northside. In 1687 the bridge was damaged by a flood resulting in the loss of a hackney and two horses. The damage to the bridge was only partially repaired.

In 1751 the second most northerly pier collapsed and damaged the adjacent arches. Between 1753 and 1755 the bridge was rebuilt by George Semple, to correct flood and other structural damage and as one of the first initiatives of the Wide Streets Commission. During this construction, some original features were removed, including the Equestrian Statue Of George I, by John van Nost the Elder, which was moved in 1798 to the gardens of the Mansion House. In 1937 it was bought by the Barber Institute for Fine Arts in Birmingham, in front of which it now stands. For much of the 18th century, Essex Bridge was the most westerly bridge on the Liffey and marked the furthest point upriver to which ships with masts could travel. Many ships needed to travel this far upriver in order to berth in front of the old Custom House, the centre of merchant activity in the city from 1707 until 1791.

From 1872, the bridge was further remodelled (on Westminster Bridge in London), being widened and flattened with cast iron supports extended out from the stonework so as to carry pavements on either side of the roadway. The bridge was (and is still) lit by ornate lamp standards also in cast iron.

The bridge was reopened as Grattan Bridge in 1874, being named after Henry Grattan MP (1746-1820).

Recent development
From 2002, Dublin City Council undertook a reconstruction of the bridge deck, with granite paving for the footpaths and a set of benches with wooden seats and toughened glass backs.

As part of what was intended to be a "European-style book market", in 2004 several temporary kiosks (prefabricated in Spain) were also controversially built on the bridge. Originally intended to create "a contemporary version of an inhabited bridge, such as the Ponte Vecchio in Florence", these kiosks were later removed.

Nomenclature
As is tradition among Dubliners, the name used locally for the bridge will vary from Capel Street Bridge, to Grattan Bridge and the original Essex Bridge.

References

Bridges in Dublin (city)
Bridges completed in 1753
1753 establishments in the British Empire